The 4th New Zealand Parliament was a term of the Parliament of New Zealand.

Elections for this term were held in 61 electorates between 12 February and 6 April 1866 to elect 70 MPs. Parliament was prorogued in late 1870. During the term of this Parliament, two Ministries were in power. During this term, four Māori electorates were first established in 1867, and the first elections held in 1868.

Sessions
The 4th Parliament opened on 30 June 1866, following the 1866 general election. It sat for five sessions, and was prorogued on 6 December 1875.

Historical context
Political parties had not been established yet; this only happened after the 1890 election. Anyone attempting to form an administration thus had to win support directly from individual MPs. This made first forming, and then retaining a government difficult and challenging.

The 4th Parliament sat during the time of the New Zealand Wars, with the Second Taranaki War proceeding at the beginning of this Parliament's term. The Central Otago Gold Rush was coming to an end, but the West Coast Gold Rush had only just begun.

The capital had moved from Auckland to Wellington in 1865. Parliament was meeting in the Provincial Council buildings. With the increase in the number of Members of Parliament to 70, conditions became very crowded. The original building "grew like topsy" until the end of the 19th century, and was consumed by fire on 11 December 1907.

In 1868, the first elections were held in the four Māori electorates that were created in the previous year.

Ministries
A few months before the 1866 general elections, Edward Stafford became Premier for the second time. On 16 October 1865, the second Stafford Ministry was formed. This lasted well into the term of the 4th Parliament on 28 June 1869.

The premiership changed back to William Fox. The third Fox Ministry was in place from 28 June 1869 to 10 September 1872, well into the term of the 5th Parliament.

Electorates
61 electorates were used for the 1866 elections. This was a significant increase from the 43 electorates used in the previous (1860–1861) election, and resulted from the Representation Act 1865. The bill had its third reading and was assented in October 1865.

Initial composition of the 4th Parliament
70 seats were created across the 61 electorates. The City of Wellington electorate was the only three-member electorate, and seven electorates were represented by two members. The remaining 53 electorates were represented by a single member.

Changes during term
There were numerous changes during the term of the 4th Parliament.

Existing electorates

Ashley
Walker resigned in 1867. Henry Tancred won the subsequent 1867 by-election.

Auckland West
James Williamson resigned in 1867. He was succeeded by Patrick Dignan.

Avon
Ward resigned in 1867. He was succeeded by William Reeves, who himself resigned in 1868. William Rolleston won the subsequent 1868 by-election.

Bruce
Cargill resigned in 1870 and was succeeded by James Clark Brown.

Caversham
Burns resigned in 1870 and was succeeded by James McIndoe.

City of Christchurch
FitzGerald resigned in 1867 and was succeeded by William Travers, who himself resigned in 1870. William Sefton Moorhouse took the seat for the remaining months in 1870.

City of Dunedin
Paterson resigned in 1869 and was succeeded by Thomas Birch.

City of Nelson
Stafford resigned in 1868 and was succeeded by Nathaniel Edwards.

Collingwood
Richmond resigned in 1868 and was succeeded by Arthur Shuckburgh Collins.

Kaiapoi
Beswick resigned in 1867. He was succeeded by John Studholme.

Manuherikia
Baldwin resigned in 1867. He was succeeded by David Mervyn.

Marsden
Hull resigned in 1868. He was succeeded by John Munro.

Mongonui
Ball resigned in 1870. He was succeeded by Thomas Gillies on 30 March 1870.

Mount Herbert
Moorhouse was elected in the Mount Herbert electorate on 22 February 1866. He also stood in the Westland electorate and was returned 16 March 1866. He chose to represent Westland. A by-election was held on 27 July 1866 and Thomas Potts was returned unopposed.

New Plymouth
Richardson resigned in 1867 and was succeeded by Harry Atkinson, who himself resigned in 1869. Thomas Kelly won the 1869 by-election.

Newton
Graham resigned in 1869 and was succeeded by Robert James Creighton.

Northern Division
Henderson resigned in 1867. The 6 July 1867 by-election was won by Thomas Macfarlane.

O'Neill resigned in 1869 and was succeeded by Henry Warner Farnall.

Oamaru
Campbell resigned in 1869 and was succeeded by Charles Christie Graham.

Omata
Atkinson resigned in 1867 and was succeeded in the 1868 by-election by Charles Brown, who himself resigned in 1870. Frederic Carrington was the successful candidate in the 1870 by-election.

Parnell
Whitaker resigned in 1867 and was succeeded by Charles Heaphy.

Pensioner Settlements
De Quincey resigned in 1867. The 5 August 1867 by-election was won by John Kerr. A second person, a Mr Jackson, was nominated, but the returning officer would not accept the nomination, as Jackson was not on the electoral roll. Thus, Kerr was declared elected unopposed.

Picton
Beauchamp resigned in 1867. He was succeeded by William Adams, who himself resigned in 1868. Courtney Kenny won the 1868 by-election.

Port Chalmers
Dick, who was elected on 17 March 1866, resigned on 15 October 1866. He successfully contested the 15 December 1866 by-election, but resigned again on 26 April 1867. David Forsyth Main successfully contested the 1867 by-election.

Raglan
Newman resigned in 1867. He was succeeded by James Farmer.

Rangitīkei
Watt resigned in 1868. He was succeeded by William Fox, who won the 1868 by-election.

Roslyn
Hepburn resigned in 1868. He was succeeded by Henry Driver.

Taieri
Reid resigned in 1869. He was succeeded by Henry Howorth.

Timaru
Cox resigned in 1868. He was succeeded by Edward Stafford.

Town of Lyttelton
Hargreaves resigned in 1867. He was succeeded by George Macfarlan, who won the 1867 by-election. Macfarlan died on 9 October 1868 and was succeeded by John Thomas Peacock in a 2 November 1868 by-election.

Waikouaiti
Murison resigned in 1868 and was succeeded by Robert Mitchell. Mitchell himself resigned in the following year and was replaced by Francis Rich.

Waimea
Oliver resigned in 1867. He was succeeded by Edward Baigent.

Wallace
McNeil resigned in 1869 and was succeeded by Cuthbert Cowan. Cowan himself resigned in the same year he got elected and was replaced by George Webster.

Westland
The Westland Representation Act 1867 introduced changes to the Waimea and Westland electorates. Their areas were reassigned and four electorates formed. Waimea lost some area, but continued to exist. Westland was abolished in 1867. A new electorate (Westland Boroughs) was established, and Moorhouse was transferred to it. Other new electorates, for which by-elections were to be held, were Westland North and Westland South.

New electorate

Westland Boroughs
Westland Boroughs was established through the Westland Representation Act 1867, and Moorhouse transferred to it. He resigned in 1868, and William Henry Harrison won the resulting 1868 by-election.

Westland North
Westland North was established through the Westland Representation Act 1867. Timothy Gallagher was its first representative, elected in the 9 April 1868 by-election. He resigned on 13 May 1870 and was succeeded by Thomas Kynnersley following a 2 July 1870 by-election.

Westland South
Westland South was established through the Westland Representation Act 1867. Edmund Barff was its representative, elected in the 6 April 1868 by-election.

Māori electorates
The first elections for the new Māori electorates were held in 1868.

Eastern Maori
Tāreha Te Moananui was the first representative for the Eastern Maori electorate.

Northern Maori
Frederick Nene Russell was the first representative for the Northern Maori electorate.

Southern Maori
John Patterson was the first representative for the Southern Maori electorate.

Western Maori
Mete Kīngi Paetahi was the first representative for the Western Maori electorate.

Notes

References

04